Olivier Eugène Prosper Charles Messiaen (10 December 1908 – 27 April 1992) was a French composer, organist, and ornithologist who was one of the major composers of the 20th century. His music is rhythmically complex; harmonically and melodically he employs a system he called modes of limited transposition, which he abstracted from the systems of material generated by his early compositions and improvisations. He wrote music for chamber ensembles and orchestra, vocal music, as well as for solo organ and piano, and also experimented with the use of novel electronic instruments developed in Europe during his lifetime.

Messiaen entered the Paris Conservatoire at the age of 11 and studied with Paul Dukas, Maurice Emmanuel, Charles-Marie Widor and Marcel Dupré, among others. He was appointed organist at the Église de la Sainte-Trinité, Paris, in 1931, a post held for 61 years until his death. He taught at the Schola Cantorum de Paris during the 1930s. After the fall of France in 1940, Messiaen was interned for nine months in the German prisoner of war camp Stalag VIII-A, where he composed his  ("Quartet for the end of time") for the four instruments available in the prison—piano, violin, cello and clarinet. The piece was first performed by Messiaen and fellow prisoners for an audience of inmates and prison guards. He was appointed professor of harmony soon after his release in 1941 and professor of composition in 1966 at the Paris Conservatoire, positions that he held until his retirement in 1978. His many distinguished pupils included Iannis Xenakis, George Benjamin, Alexander Goehr, Pierre Boulez, Tristan Murail, Karlheinz Stockhausen, and Yvonne Loriod, who became his second wife.

Messiaen perceived colours when he heard certain musical chords (a phenomenon known as synaesthesia); according to him, combinations of these colours were important in his compositional process. He travelled widely and wrote works inspired by diverse influences, including Japanese music, the landscape of Bryce Canyon in Utah, and the life of St. Francis of Assisi. For a short period Messiaen experimented with the parametrisation associated with "total serialism", in which field he is often cited as an innovator. His style absorbed many global musical influences such as Indonesian gamelan (tuned percussion often features prominently in his orchestral works).

He found birdsong fascinating, notating bird songs worldwide and incorporating birdsong transcriptions into his music. His innovative use of colour, his conception of the relationship between time and music, and his use of birdsong are among the features that make Messiaen's music distinctive.

Biography

Youth and studies

Olivier Eugène Prosper Charles Messiaen was born on 10 December 1908 at 20 Boulevard Sixte-Isnard in Avignon, France, into a literary family. He was the elder of two sons of Cécile Anne Marie Antoinette Sauvage, a poet, and Pierre Léon Joseph Messiaen, a scholar and teacher of English from a farm near Wervicq-Sud who translated the plays of William Shakespeare into French. Messiaen later said this sequence of poems influenced him deeply and he cited it as prophetic of his future artistic career. His brother Alain André Prosper Messiaen, four years his junior, was also a poet.

At the outbreak of World War I, Pierre enlisted and Cécile took their two boys to live with her brother in Grenoble. There Messiaen became fascinated with drama, reciting Shakespeare to his brother with the help of a home-made toy theatre with translucent backdrops made from old cellophane wrappers. At this time he also adopted the Roman Catholic faith. Later, Messiaen felt most at home in the Alps of the Dauphiné, where he had a house built south of Grenoble where he composed most of his music.

He took piano lessons, having already taught himself to play. His interests included the recent music of French composers Claude Debussy and Maurice Ravel, and he asked for opera vocal scores for Christmas presents. He also saved to buy scores and one such was Edvard Grieg's Peer Gynt whose "beautiful Norwegian melodic lines with the taste of folk song ... gave me a love of melody." Around this time he began to compose. In 1918 his father returned from the war and the family moved to Nantes. He continued music lessons; one of his teachers, Jehan de Gibon, gifted him a score of Debussy's opera , which Messiaen described as "a thunderbolt" and "probably the most decisive influence on me". The following year Pierre Messiaen gained a teaching post at Sorbonne University in Paris. Messiaen entered the Paris Conservatoire in 1919, aged 11.

Messiaen made excellent academic progress at the Paris Conservatoire. In 1924, aged 15, he was awarded second prize in harmony, having been taught in that subject by professor Jean Gallon. In 1925, he won first prize in piano accompaniment, and in 1926 he gained first prize in fugue. After studying with Maurice Emmanuel, he was awarded second prize for the history of music in 1928. Emmanuel's example engendered an interest in ancient Greek rhythms and exotic modes. After showing improvisational skills on the piano Messiaen studied organ with Marcel Dupré. Messiaen gained first prize in organ playing and improvisation in 1929. After a year studying composition with Charles-Marie Widor, in autumn 1927 he entered the class of the newly appointed Paul Dukas. Messiaen's mother died of tuberculosis shortly before the class began. Despite his grief, he resumed his studies, and in 1930 Messiaen won first prize in composition.

While a student he composed his first published works—his eight Préludes for piano (the earlier Le banquet céleste was published subsequently). These exhibit Messiaen's use of his modes of limited transposition and palindromic rhythms (Messiaen called these non-retrogradable rhythms). His official début came in 1931 with his orchestral suite Les offrandes oubliées. That year he first heard a gamelan group, sparking his interest in the use of tuned percussion.

La Trinité, La jeune France, and Messiaen's war

In the autumn of 1927, Messiaen joined Dupré's organ course. Dupré later wrote that Messiaen, having never seen an organ console, sat quietly for an hour while Dupré explained and demonstrated the instrument, and then came back a week later to play Johann Sebastian Bach's Fantasia in C minor to an impressive standard. From 1929, Messiaen regularly deputised at the Église de la Sainte-Trinité, Paris, for the ailing Charles Quef. The post became vacant in 1931 when Quef died, and Dupré, Charles Tournemire and Widor among others supported Messiaen's candidacy. His formal application included a letter of recommendation from Widor. The appointment was confirmed in 1931, and he remained the organist at the church for more than 60 years. He also assumed a post at the Schola Cantorum de Paris in the early 1930s. In 1932, he composed the Apparition de l'église éternelle for organ.

He also married the violinist and composer Claire Delbos (daughter of Victor Delbos) that year. Their marriage inspired him both to compose works for her to play (Thème et variations for violin and piano in the year they were married) and to write pieces to celebrate their domestic happiness, including the song cycle Poèmes pour Mi in 1936, which he orchestrated in 1937. Mi was Messiaen's affectionate nickname for his wife. On 14 July 1937, the Messiaens' son, Pascal Emmanuel was born; Messiaen celebrated the occasion by writing Chants de Terre et de Ciel. The marriage turned to tragedy when Delbos lost her memory after an operation towards the end of World War II. She spent the rest of her life in mental institutions.

In 1934, Messiaen released his first major work for organ, La Nativité du Seigneur. He wrote a followup four years later titled Les Corps glorieux, however it was premièred in 1945.

In 1936, along with André Jolivet, Daniel-Lesur and Yves Baudrier, Messiaen formed the group La jeune France ("Young France"). Their manifesto implicitly attacked the frivolity predominant in contemporary Parisian music and rejected Jean Cocteau's 1918 Le coq et l'arlequin in favour of a "living music, having the impetus of sincerity, generosity and artistic conscientiousness". Messiaen's career soon departed from this polemical phase.

In response to a commission for a piece to accompany light-and-water shows on the Seine during the Paris Exposition, in 1937 Messiaen demonstrated his interest in using the ondes Martenot, an electronic instrument, by composing Fêtes des belles eaux for an ensemble of six. He included a part for the instrument in several of his subsequent compositions. During this period he composed several multi-movement organ works. He arranged his orchestral suite L'ascension for organ, replacing the orchestral version's third movement with an entirely new movement, Transports de joie d'une âme devant la gloire du Christ qui est la sienne ("Ecstasies of a soul before the glory of Christ which is the soul's own"). He also wrote the extensive cycles La Nativité du Seigneur ("The Nativity of the Lord") and Les corps glorieux ("The glorious bodies").

At the outbreak of World War II, Messiaen was drafted into the French army. Due to poor eyesight, he was enlisted as a medical auxiliary rather than an active combatant. He was captured at Verdun, where he befriended clarinettist Henri Akoka; they were taken to Görlitz in May 1940, and imprisoned at Stalag VIII-A. He met a cellist (Étienne Pasquier) and a violinist among his fellow prisoners. He wrote a trio for them, which he gradually incorporated into a more expansive new work, Quatuor pour la fin du temps ("Quartet for the End of Time"). With the help of a friendly German guard, he acquired manuscript paper and pencils. The work was first performed in January 1941 to an audience of prisoners and prison guards, with the composer playing a poorly maintained upright piano in freezing conditions and the trio playing third-hand unkempt instruments. The enforced introspection and reflection of camp life bore fruit in one of 20th-century classical music's acknowledged masterpieces. The title's "end of time" alludes to the Apocalypse, and also to the way that Messiaen, through rhythm and harmony, used time in a manner completely different from his predecessors and contemporaries.

The idea of a European Centre of Education and Culture "Meeting Point Music Messiaen" on the site of Stalag VIII-A, for children and youth, artists, musicians and everyone in the region emerged in December 2004, was developed with the involvement of Messiaen's widow as a joint project between the council districts in Germany and Poland, and was finally completed in 2014.

Tristan and serialism

Shortly after his release from Görlitz in May 1941 in large part due to the persuasions of his friend and teacher Marcel Dupré, Messiaen, who was now a household name, was appointed a professor of harmony at the Paris Conservatoire, where he taught until his retirement in 1978. He compiled his Technique de mon langage musical ("Technique of my musical language") published in 1944, in which he quotes many examples from his music, particularly the Quartet. Although only in his mid-thirties, his students described him as an outstanding teacher. Among his early students were the composers Pierre Boulez and Karel Goeyvaerts. Other pupils included Karlheinz Stockhausen in 1952, Alexander Goehr in 1956–57, Tristan Murail in 1967–72 and George Benjamin during the late 1970s. The Greek composer Iannis Xenakis was referred to him in 1951; Messiaen urged Xenakis to take advantage of his background in mathematics and architecture in his music.

In 1943, Messiaen wrote Visions de l'Amen ("Visions of the Amen") for two pianos for Yvonne Loriod and himself to perform. Shortly thereafter he composed the enormous solo piano cycle Vingt regards sur l'enfant-Jésus ("Twenty gazes upon the child Jesus") for her. Again for Loriod, he wrote Trois petites liturgies de la présence divine ("Three small liturgies of the Divine Presence") for female chorus and orchestra, which includes a difficult solo piano part.

Two years after Visions de l'Amen, Messiaen composed the song cycle Harawi, the first of three works inspired by the legend of Tristan and Isolde. The second of these works about human (as opposed to divine) love was the result of a commission from Serge Koussevitzky. Messiaen stated that the commission did not specify the length of the work or the size of the orchestra. This was the ten-movement Turangalîla-Symphonie. It is not a conventional symphony, but rather an extended meditation on the joy of human union and love. It does not contain the sexual guilt inherent in Richard Wagner's Tristan und Isolde because Messiaen believed that sexual love is a divine gift. The third piece inspired by the Tristan myth was Cinq rechants for twelve unaccompanied singers, described by Messiaen as influenced by the alba of the troubadours. Messiaen visited the United States in 1949, where his music was conducted by Koussevitsky and Leopold Stokowski. His Turangalîla-Symphonie was first performed in the US the same year, conducted by Leonard Bernstein.

Messiaen taught an analysis class at the Paris Conservatoire. In 1947 he taught (and performed with Loriod) for two weeks in Budapest. In 1949 he taught at Tanglewood and presented his work at the Darmstadt new music summer school. While he did not employ the twelve-tone technique, after three years teaching analysis of twelve-tone scores, including works by Arnold Schoenberg, he experimented with ways of making scales of other elements (including duration, articulation and dynamics) analogous to the chromatic pitch scale. The results of these innovations was the "Mode de valeurs et d'intensités" for piano (from the Quatre études de rythme) which has been misleadingly described as the first work of "total serialism". It had a large influence on the earliest European serial composers, including Pierre Boulez and Karlheinz Stockhausen. During this period he also experimented with musique concrète, music for recorded sounds.

Birdsong and the 1960s
When in 1952 Messiaen was asked to provide a test piece for flautists at the Paris Conservatoire, he composed the piece  for flute and piano. While he had long been fascinated by birdsong, and birds had made appearances in several of his earlier works (for example ,  and ), the flute piece was based entirely on the song of the blackbird.

He took this development to a new level with his 1953 orchestral work —its material consists almost entirely of the birdsong one might hear between midnight and noon in the Jura. Paul Griffiths observed that Messiaen was a more conscientious ornithologist than any previous composer, and a more musical observer of birdsong than any previous ornithologist.

Messiaen's first wife died in 1959 after a long illness, and in 1961 he married Loriod. He began to travel widely, to attend musical events and to seek out and transcribe the songs of more exotic birds in the wild. Despite this, he only spoke French. Loriod frequently assisted her husband's detailed studies of birdsong while walking with him, by making tape recordings for later reference. In 1962 he visited Japan, where Gagaku music and Noh theatre inspired the orchestral "Japanese sketches", which contain stylised imitations of traditional Japanese instruments.

Messiaen's music was by this time championed by, among others, Pierre Boulez, who programmed first performances at his Domaine musical concerts and the Donaueschingen festival. The latter piece was the result of a commission for a composition for three trombones and three xylophones; Messiaen added to this more brass, wind, percussion and piano, and specified a xylophone, xylorimba and marimba rather than three xylophones. Another work of this period, was commissioned as a commemoration of the dead of the two World Wars and was performed first semi-privately in the Sainte-Chapelle, then publicly in Chartres Cathedral with Charles de Gaulle in the audience.

In 1966, he was officially appointed professor of composition at the Paris Conservatoire, although he had in effect been teaching composition for years.

Transfiguration, Canyons, St. Francis, and the Beyond
Messiaen's next work was the large-scale La Transfiguration de Notre Seigneur Jésus-Christ. The composition occupied him from 1965 to 1969 and the musicians employed include a 100-voice ten-part choir, seven solo instruments and large orchestra. Its fourteen movements are a meditation on the story of Christ's Transfiguration. Shortly after its completion, Messiaen received a commission from Alice Tully for a work to celebrate the U.S. bicentennial. He arranged a visit to the US in spring 1972, and was inspired by Bryce Canyon in Utah, where he observed the canyon's distinctive colours and birdsong. The twelve-movement orchestral piece Des canyons aux étoiles... was the result, first performed in 1974 in New York.

In 1971, he was asked to compose a piece for the Paris Opéra. While reluctant to undertake such a major project, he was persuaded by French president Georges Pompidou to accept the commission and began work on his Saint-François d'Assise in 1975 after two years of preparation. The composition was intensive (he also wrote his own libretto) and occupied him from 1975 to 1979; the orchestration was carried out from 1979 until 1983. Messiaen preferred to describe the final work as a "spectacle" rather than an opera. It was first performed in 1983. Some commentators at the time thought that the opera would be his valediction (at times Messiaen himself believed so), but he continued to compose. In 1984, he published a major collection of organ pieces, Livre du Saint Sacrement; other works include birdsong pieces for solo piano, and works for piano with orchestra.

In the summer of 1978, Messiaen was forced to retire from teaching at the Paris Conservatoire due to French law. He was promoted to the highest rank of the Légion d'honneur, the Grand-Croix, in 1987, and was awarded the decoration in London by his old friend, Jean Langlais. An operation prevented his participation in the celebration of his 70th birthday in 1978, but in 1988 tributes for Messiaen's 80th included a complete performance in London's Royal Festival Hall of St. François, which the composer attended, and Erato's publication of a seventeen-CD collection of Messiaen's music including a disc of the composer in conversation with Claude Samuel.

Although in considerable pain near the end of his life (requiring repeated surgery on his back) he was able to fulfil a commission from the New York Philharmonic Orchestra, Éclairs sur l'au-delà..., which was premièred six months after his death. He died in the Beaujon Hospital in Clichy on 27 April 1992, aged 83.

On going through his papers, Loriod discovered that, in the last months of his life, he had been composing a concerto for four musicians he felt particularly grateful to, namely herself, the cellist Mstislav Rostropovich, the oboist Heinz Holliger and the flautist Catherine Cantin (hence the title Concert à quatre). Four of the five intended movements were substantially complete; Yvonne Loriod undertook the orchestration of the second half of the first movement and of the whole of the fourth with advice from George Benjamin. It was premiered by the dedicatees in September 1994.

Music

Messiaen's music has been described as outside the western musical tradition, although growing out of that tradition and being influenced by it. Much of his output denies the western conventions of forward motion, development and diatonic harmonic resolution. This is partly due to the symmetries of his technique—for instance the modes of limited transposition do not admit the conventional cadences found in western classical music.

His youthful love for the fairy-tale element in Shakespeare prefigured his later expressions of Catholic liturgy. Messiaen was not interested in depicting aspects of theology such as sin; rather he concentrated on the theology of joy, divine love and redemption.

Messiaen continually evolved new composition techniques, always integrating them into his existing musical style; his final works still retain the use of modes of limited transposition. For many commentators this continual development made every major work from the Quatuor onwards a conscious summation of all that Messiaen had composed up to that time. However, very few of these major works lack new technical ideas—simple examples being the introduction of communicable language in Meditations, the invention of a new percussion instrument (the geophone) for Des canyons aux etoiles..., and the freedom from any synchronisation with the main pulse of individual parts in certain birdsong episodes of St. François d'Assise.

As well as discovering new techniques, Messiaen studied and absorbed foreign music, including Ancient Greek rhythms, Hindu rhythms (he encountered Śārṅgadeva's list of 120 rhythmic units, the deçî-tâlas), Balinese and Javanese Gamelan, birdsong, and Japanese music (see Example 1 for an instance of his use of ancient Greek and Hindu rhythms).

While he was instrumental in the academic exploration of his techniques (he compiled two treatises: the later one in five volumes was substantially complete when he died and was published posthumously), and was himself a master of music analysis, he considered the development and study of techniques a means to intellectual, aesthetic, and emotional ends. Thus Messiaen maintained that a musical composition must be measured against three separate criteria: it must be interesting, beautiful to listen to, and it must touch the listener.

Messiaen wrote a large body of music for the piano. Although a considerable pianist himself, he was undoubtedly assisted by Yvonne Loriod's formidable piano technique and ability to convey complex rhythms and rhythmic combinations; in his piano writing from Visions de l'Amen onwards he had her in mind. Messiaen said, "I am able to allow myself the greatest eccentricities because to her anything is possible."

Western artistic influences
Developments in modern French music were a major influence on Messiaen, particularly the music of Claude Debussy and his use of the whole-tone scale (which Messiaen called Mode 1 in his modes of limited transposition). Messiaen rarely used the whole-tone scale in his compositions because, he said, after Debussy and Dukas there was "nothing to add", but the modes he did use are similarly symmetrical.

Messiaen had a great admiration for the music of Igor Stravinsky, particularly the use of rhythm in earlier works such as The Rite of Spring, and his use of orchestral colour. He was further influenced by the orchestral brilliance of Heitor Villa-Lobos, who lived in Paris in the 1920s and gave acclaimed concerts there. Among composers for the keyboard, Messiaen singled out Jean-Philippe Rameau, Domenico Scarlatti, Frédéric Chopin, Debussy and Isaac Albéniz. He loved the music of Modest Mussorgsky and incorporated varied modifications of what he called the "M-shaped" melodic motif from Mussorgsky's Boris Godunov, although he modified the final interval in this motif from a perfect fourth to a tritone (Example 3).

Messiaen was further influenced by Surrealism, as may be seen from the titles of some of the piano Préludes (Un reflet dans le vent..., "A reflection in the wind") and in some of the imagery of his poetry (he published poems as prefaces to certain works, for example Les offrandes oubliées).

Colour
Colour lies at the heart of Messiaen's music. He believed that terms such as "tonal", "modal" and "serial" are misleading analytical conveniences. For him there were no modal, tonal or serial compositions, only music with or without colour. He said that Claudio Monteverdi, Mozart, Chopin, Richard Wagner, Mussorgsky and Stravinsky all wrote strongly coloured music.

In some of Messiaen's scores, he notated the colours in the music (notably in Couleurs de la cité céleste and Des canyons aux étoiles...)—the purpose being to aid the conductor in interpretation rather than to specify which colours the listener should experience. The importance of colour is linked to Messiaen's synaesthesia, which caused him to experience colours when he heard or imagined music (his form of  synaesthesia, the most common form, involved experiencing the associated colours in a non-visual form rather than perceiving them visually). In his multi-volume music theory treatise Traité de rythme, de couleur, et d'ornithologie ("Treatise of Rhythm, Colour and Birdsong"), Messiaen wrote descriptions of the colours of certain chords. His descriptions range from the simple ("gold and brown") to the highly detailed ("blue-violet rocks, speckled with little grey cubes, cobalt blue, deep Prussian blue, highlighted by a bit of violet-purple, gold, red, ruby, and stars of mauve, black and white. Blue-violet is dominant").

When asked what Messiaen's main influence had been on composers, George Benjamin said, "I think the sheer ... colour has been so influential, ... rather than being a decorative element, [Messiaen showed that colour] could be a structural, a fundamental element, ... the fundamental material of the music itself."

Symmetry
Many of Messiaen's composition techniques made use of symmetries of time and pitch.

Time

From his earliest works, Messiaen used non-retrogradable (palindromic) rhythms (Example 2). He sometimes combined rhythms with harmonic sequences in such a way that, if the process were repeated indefinitely, the music would eventually run through all possible permutations and return to its starting point. For Messiaen, this represented the "charm of impossibilities" of these processes. He only ever presented a portion of any such process, as if allowing the informed listener a glimpse of something eternal. In the first movement of Quatuor pour la fin du temps the piano and cello together provide an early example.

Pitch
Messiaen used modes he called modes of limited transposition. They are distinguished as groups of notes that can only be transposed by a semitone a limited number of times. For example, the whole-tone scale (Messiaen's Mode 1) only exists in two transpositions: namely C–D–E–F–G–A and D–E–F–G–A–B. Messiaen abstracted these modes from the harmony of his improvisations and early works. Music written using the modes avoids conventional diatonic harmonic progressions, since for example Messiaen's Mode 2 (identical to the octatonic scale used also by other composers) permits precisely the dominant seventh chords whose tonic the mode does not contain.

Time and rhythm

As well as making use of non-retrogradable rhythm and the Hindu decî-tâlas, Messiaen also composed with "additive" rhythms. This involves lengthening individual notes slightly or interpolating a short note into an otherwise regular rhythm (see Example 3), or shortening or lengthening every note of a rhythm by the same duration (adding a semiquaver to every note in a rhythm on its repeat, for example). This led Messiaen to use rhythmic cells that irregularly alternate between two and three units, a process that also occurs in Stravinsky's The Rite of Spring, which Messiaen admired.

A factor that contributes to Messiaen's suspension of the conventional perception of time in his music is the extremely slow tempos he often specifies (the fifth movement Louange à l'eternité de Jésus of Quatuor is actually given the tempo marking infiniment lent). Messiaen also used the concept of "chromatic durations", for example in his Soixante-quatre durées from Livre d'orgue, which is built from, in Messiaen's words, "64 chromatic durations from 1 to 64 demisemiquavers [thirty-second notes]—invested in groups of 4, from the ends to the centre, forwards and backwards alternately—treated as a retrograde canon. The whole peopled with birdsong."

Harmony
 In addition to making harmonic use of the modes of limited transposition, he cited the harmonic series as a physical phenomenon that provides chords with a context he felt was missing in purely serial music. An example of Messiaen's harmonic use of this phenomenon, which he called "resonance", is the last two bars of his first piano Prélude, La colombe ("The dove"): the chord is built from harmonics of the fundamental base note E.

Related to this use of resonance, Messiaen also composed music in which the lowest, or fundamental, note is combined with higher notes or chords played much more quietly. These higher notes, far from being perceived as conventional harmony, function as harmonics that alter the timbre of the fundamental note like mixture stops on a pipe organ. An example is the song of the golden oriole in Le loriot of the Catalogue d'oiseaux for solo piano (Example 4).

In his use of conventional diatonic chords, Messiaen often transcended their historically mundane connotations (for example, his frequent use of the added sixth chord as a resolution).

Birdsong
Birdsong fascinated Messiaen from an early age, and in this he found encouragement from his teacher Dukas, who reportedly urged his pupils to "listen to the birds". Messiaen included stylised birdsong in some of his early compositions (including L'abîme d'oiseaux from the Quatuor pour la fin du temps), integrating it into his sound-world by techniques like the modes of limited transposition and chord colouration. His evocations of birdsong became increasingly sophisticated, and with Le réveil des oiseaux this process reached maturity, the whole piece being built from birdsong: in effect it is a dawn chorus for orchestra. The same can be said for "Epode", the five-minute sixth movement of Chronochromie, which is scored for eighteen violins, each one playing a different birdsong. Messiaen notated the bird species with the music in the score (examples 1 and 4). The pieces are not simple transcriptions; even the works with purely bird-inspired titles, such as Catalogue d'oiseaux and Fauvette des jardins, are tone poems evoking the landscape, its colours and atmosphere.

Serialism
For a few compositions, Messiaen created scales for duration, attack and timbre analogous to the chromatic pitch scale. He expressed annoyance at the historical importance given to one of these works, Mode de valeurs et d'intensités, by musicologists intent on crediting him with the invention of "total serialism".

Messiaen later introduced what he called a "communicable language", a "musical alphabet" to encode sentences. He first used this technique in his Méditations sur le Mystère de la Sainte Trinité for organ; where the "alphabet" includes motifs for the concepts to have, to be and God, while the sentences encoded feature sections from the writings of St. Thomas Aquinas.

Writings

See also 
 Olivier Messiaen Competition

Notes

References

Further reading

 Baggech, Melody Ann (1998). An English Translation of Olivier Messiaen's "Traite de Rythme, de Couleur, et d'Ornithologie" Norman: The University of Oklahoma.
 Barker, Thomas (2012). "The Social and Aesthetic Situation of Olivier Messiaen's Religious Music: Turangalîla Symphonie." International Review of the Aesthetics and Sociology of Music 43/1:53–70.
 Benitez, Vincent P. (2000). "A Creative Legacy: Messiaen as Teacher of Analysis." College Music Symposium 40: 117–39.
 Benitez, Vincent P. (2001). "Pitch Organization and Dramatic Design in Saint François d'Assise of Olivier Messiaen." PhD diss., Bloomington: Indiana University.
 Benitez, Vincent P. (2002). "Simultaneous Contrast and Additive Designs in Olivier Messiaen's Opera Saint François d'Assise." Music Theory Online 8.2 (August 2002). Music Theory Online
 Benitez, Vincent P. (2004). "Aspects of Harmony in Messiaen's Later Music: An Examination of the Chords of Transposed Inversions on the Same Bass Note." Journal of Musicological Research 23, no. 2: 187–226.
 Benitez, Vincent P. (2004). "Narrating Saint Francis's Spiritual Journey: Referential Pitch Structures and Symbolic Images in Olivier Messiaen's Saint François d'Assise." In Poznan Studies on Opera, edited by Maciej Jablonski, 363–411.
 Benitez, Vincent P. (2008). "Messiaen as Improviser." Dutch Journal of Music Theory 13, no. 2 (May 2008): 129–44.
 Benitez, Vincent P. (2009). "Reconsidering Messiaen as Serialist." Music Analysis 28, nos. 2–3 (2009): 267–99 (published 21 April 2011).
 Benitez, Vincent P. (2010). "Messiaen and Aquinas." In Messiaen the Theologian, edited by Andrew Shenton, 101–26. Aldershot: Ashgate.
 Benítez, Vincent Pérez (2019). Olivier Messiaen's Opera, Saint François d'Assise. Bloomington, IN: Indiana University Press. .
 Boivin, Jean (1993). "La Classe de Messiaen: Historique, reconstitution, impact". Ph.D. diss. Montreal: Ecole Polytechnique, Montreal.
 Boswell-Kurc, Lilise (2001). "Olivier Messiaen's Religious War-Time Works and Their Controversial Reception in France (1941–1946) ". Ph.D. diss. New York: New York University.

 
 Burns, Jeffrey Phillips (1995). "Messiaen's Modes of Limited Transposition Reconsidered". M.M. thesis, Madison: University of Wisconsin-Madison.
 Cheong Wai-Ling (2003). "Messiaen's Chord Tables: Ordering the Disordered". Tempo 57, no. 226 (October): 2–10.
 Cheong Wai-Ling (2008). "Neumes and Greek Rhythms: The Breakthrough in Messiaen's Birdsong". Acta Musicologica 80, no. 1:1–32.
 Dingle, Christopher (2013). Messiaen's Final Works. Farnham, UK: Ashgate. .
 Fallon, Robert Joseph (2005). "Messiaen's Mimesis: The Language and Culture of The Bird Styles". Ph.D. diss. Berkeley: University of California, Berkeley.
 Fallon, Robert (2008). "Birds, Beasts, and Bombs in Messiaen's Cold War Mass". The Journal of Musicology 26, no. 2 (Spring): 175–204.
 

 Hardink, Jason M. (2007). "Messiaen and Plainchant". D.M.A. diss. Houston: Rice University.
 Harris, Joseph Edward (2004). "Musique coloree: Synesthetic Correspondence in the Works of Olivier Messiaen". Ph.D. diss. Ames: The University of Iowa.
 Hill, Matthew Richard (1995). "Messiaen's Regard du silence as an Expression of Catholic Faith". D.M.A. diss. Madison: The University of Wisconsin, Madison.
 Laycock, Gary Eng Yeow (2010). "Re-evaluating Olivier Messiaen's Musical Language from 1917 to 1935". Ph.D. diss. Bloomington: Indiana University, 2010.
 Luchese, Diane (1998). "Olivier Messiaen's Slow Music: Glimpses of Eternity in Time". Ph.D. diss. Evanston: Northwestern University
 McGinnis, Margaret Elizabeth (2003). "Playing the Fields: Messiaen, Music, and the Extramusical". Ph.D. diss. Chapel Hill: The University of North Carolina at Chapel Hill.
 Nelson, David Lowell (1992). "An Analysis of Olivier Messiaen's Chant Paraphrases". 2 vols. Ph.D. diss. Evanston: Northwestern University
 Ngim, Alan Gerald (1997). "Olivier Messiaen as a Pianist: A Study of Tempo and Rhythm Based on His Recordings of Visions de l'amen". D.M.A. diss. Coral Gables: University of Miami.
 Peterson, Larry Wayne (1973). "Messiaen and Rhythm: Theory and Practice". Ph.D. diss. Chapel Hill: The University of North Carolina at Chapel Hill
 Puspita, Amelia (2008). "The Influence of Balinese Gamelan on the Music of Olivier Messiaen". D.M.A. diss. Cincinnati: University of Cincinnati
 

Schultz, Rob (2008). "Melodic Contour and Nonretrogradable Structure in the Birdsong of Olivier Messiaen". Music Theory Spectrum 30, no. 1 (Spring): 89–137.
 Shenton, Andrew (1998). "The Unspoken Word: Olivier Messiaen's 'langage communicable'". Ph.D. diss. Cambridge: Harvard University.

 Simeone, Nigel (2004). "'Chez Messiaen, tout est priére': Messiaen's Appointment at the Trinité". The Musical Times 145, no. 1889 (Winter): 36–53.
 Simeone, Nigel (2008). "Messiaen, Koussevitzky and the USA". The Musical Times 149, no. 1905 (Winter): 25–44.

 Welsh Ibanez, Deborah (2005). Color, Timbre, and Resonance: Developments in Olivier Messiaen's Use of Percussion Between 1956–1965. D.M.A. diss. Coral Gables: University of Miami
 Zheng, Zhong (2004). A Study of Messiaen's Solo Piano Works. Ph.D. diss. Hong Kong: The Chinese University of Hong Kong.

Films
Apparition of the Eternal Church – Paul Festa's 2006 film about responses of 31 artists to Messiaen's music.
Messiaen at 80 (1988). Directed by Sue Knussen.
Olivier Messiaen et les oiseaux (1973). Directed by Michel Fano and Denise Tual.
Olivier Messiaen – The Crystal Liturgy (2007 [DVD release date]). Directed by Olivier Mille.
Olivier Messiaen: Works (1991). DVD on which Messiaen performs "Improvisations" on the organ at the Paris Trinity Church.
The South Bank Show: Olivier Messiaen: The Music of Faith (1985). Directed by Alan Benson. BFI database entry.
Quartet for the End of Time, with the President's Own Marine Band Ensemble, A Film by H. Paul Moon

External links

"Messiaen, Olivier" in Oxford Music Online (by subscription)
BBC Messiaen Profile
oliviermessiaen.org Up to date website by Malcolm Ball, includes the latest recordings and concerts, a comprehensive bibliography, photos, analyses and reviews, a very extensive bio of Yvonne Loriod with discography, and more.
Infography about Olivier Messiaen
oliviermessiaen.net, hosted by the Boston University Messiaen Project [BUMP]. Includes detailed information on the composer's life and works, events, and links to other Messiaen websites.
www.philharmonia.co.uk/messiaen, the Philharmonia Orchestra's Messiaen website. The site contains articles, unseen images, programme notes and films to go alongside the orchestra's series of concerts celebrating the Centenary of Olivier Messiaen's birth.
Music for the End of Time, David Schiff article in The Nation, posted 25 January 2006 (13 February 2006 issue). Formally a review of Messiaen by Peter Hill and Nigel Simeone, but provides an overview of Messiaen's life and works.
Music and the Holocaust – Olivier Messiaen

My Messiaen Modes A visual representation of Messiaen's modes of limited transposition.

Listening
 played by Martina Trumpp, violin and Bohumir Stehlik, piano
Thème et variations – Helen Kim, violin; Adam Bowles, piano Luna Nova New Music Ensemble
Le merle noir – John McMurtery, flute; Adam Bowles, piano Luna Nova New Music Ensemble
Quatuor pour la fin du temps – Luna Nova New Music Ensemble
Regard de l'esprit de joie from Vingt regards..., Tom Poster, pianist
 played on a Mühleisen pipe organ
In-depth feature on Olivier Messiaen by Radio France International's English service
 by Ukho Ensemble Kyiv
 Olivier Messiaen. Le Banquet Céleste (1928). Andrew Pink (2021) Exordia ad missam.

 
1908 births
1992 deaths
20th-century classical composers
Conservatoire de Paris alumni
Academic staff of the Conservatoire de Paris
Academic staff of the École Normale de Musique de Paris
Composers for piano
Composers for pipe organ
EMI Classics and Virgin Classics artists
Ernst von Siemens Music Prize winners
French classical composers
French male classical composers
French classical organists
French male organists
French composers of sacred music
French military personnel of World War II
French ornithologists
Deutsche Grammophon artists
French Roman Catholics
Kyoto laureates in Arts and Philosophy
Members of the Académie des beaux-arts
Modernist composers
Occitan musicians
Organ improvisers
Musicians from Avignon
Pupils of Maurice Emmanuel
Royal Philharmonic Society Gold Medallists
Academic staff of the Schola Cantorum de Paris
Wolf Prize in Arts laureates
World War II prisoners of war held by Germany

Grand Croix of the Légion d'honneur
Commanders of the Order of the Crown (Belgium)
Recipients of the Léonie Sonning Music Prize
20th-century French composers
20th-century French male musicians
Male classical organists